Combined Military Hospital (Dhaka) or CMH is a hospital located in Dhaka Cantonment. It is part of the Combined Military Hospital chain situated in all cantonments of Bangladesh. CMH has also promoted doctors who have continued to work as military officials, even after retiring or relocating due to family man. Brigadier General Jamil Ahmed, BSP, MPhil, MPH, is the Commandant (Director) and Brigadier General Md Abdur Razzak is Chief Physician of this hospital.

References 

Hospitals in Dhaka
Military hospitals